The Autobiography of William Carlos Williams (also known as The Autobiography, or simply, Autobiography) is an autobiographical book written by William Carlos Williams and published by W. W. Norton & Company in 1951.

References

American autobiographies
1951 non-fiction books
W. W. Norton & Company books